Gakuryō Nakamura (中村岳陵, Nakamura Gakuryō) (1890–1969) was a Japanese Nihonga painter and designer.

He received a commission to decorate the Hōmei-den state banquet hall of the Tokyo Imperial Palace. He designed the tapestry works for the decorations of the wall called “Toyohata-gumo (A Pretty Bank of Clouds)”. He was also commissioned to decorate the Ume-no-Ma audience room, a hall that has an area of 152 square meters or 46 tsubo. His “Kouhaku-bai” drawing is at the centre of the wall.

See also 
 Seison Maeda (1885–1977), one of the leading Nihonga painters
 List of Nihonga painters

References

External links 
 Artnet | Gakuryō Nakamura

1890 births
1969 deaths
Nihonga painters
Buddhist artists
Recipients of the Order of Culture
Artists from Shizuoka Prefecture
20th-century Japanese painters